Zhu Qingshi FRSC (born 1946) is a Chinese physical chemist and writer. He is the former president of the University of Science and Technology of China (1998-2008), and the founding president of Southern University of Science and Technology (2009-2014).

Life and career 
1946. Zhu was born in Chengdu, Sichuan, China.

1963. Graduated from Huaxi Secondary School in Chengdu (originally called Chengdu 13th School), China.

1968. Graduated from the University of Science and Technology of China with a degree in physics.

1991. Elected as an academician of the Chinese Academy of Sciences.

1994. Became chief of its Laboratory of Bond Selective Chemistry.

1996. Appointed Vice-President of the University of Science and Technology of China.

1998. Appointed the President of the University of Science and Technology of China.

Honours 
Academician Chinese Academy of Sciences
Honorary doctorate, Soka University of Japan
1994 Thompson Memorial Award, Spectrochima Actas.

References

1946 births
Living people
Chinese spiritual writers
Educators from Sichuan
Fellows of the Royal Society of Chemistry
Members of the Chinese Academy of Sciences
People's Republic of China Buddhists
Presidents of the University of Science and Technology of China
Presidents of Southern University of Science and Technology
Scientists from Sichuan
University of Science and Technology of China alumni
Writers from Chengdu